Donna Lee Butterworth (February 23, 1956 – March 6, 2018) was an American actress and singer, best known for starring opposite Elvis Presley in the 1966 musical comedy Paradise, Hawaiian Style, when she was 10 years old.

Butterworth's career as an actor and performer was brief; however, during that short time, she received critical acclaim.

Early life
Donna Lee Butterworth was born in Philadelphia, Pennsylvania on February 23, 1956, the daughter of Isabella "Isa" Chalfant. She had one sibling, a brother named William "Bill" Butterworth.

Butterworth's family lived in Pennsylvania for the first three years of her life before they moved to Hawaii, where Butterworth remained until her death. She learned to play the ukulele soon after moving to Hawaii.

Career 
Performing Hawaiian music from an early age, Donna gave concerts around the islands, performed with Don Ho, and appeared on The Dean Martin Show, The Danny Kaye Show and The Hollywood Palace. She was nominated for a Golden Globe Award for her role in the 1965 film The Family Jewels. In 1966, she appeared opposite Elvis Presley, singing several duets with him in Paradise, Hawaiian Style. Little Leatherneck, an unsold sitcom pilot film in which she appeared, aired on ABC television as part of the 7-week 1966 series Summer Fun.

Butterworth ultimately left acting after her brief stardom; she continued in the entertainment business as a singer.

Death
Butterworth died on March 6, 2018, at a medical center in Hilo, Hawaii, from undisclosed causes. She was 62 years old.

Filmography

Film

Television

References

External links
 

  Donna Butterworth and others talk about working with Elvis Presley in his movies. The Oklahoman. Accessed March 13, 2018.

1956 births
2018 deaths
Actresses from Hawaii
Actresses from Philadelphia
20th-century American actresses
21st-century American women